"R.E.M." (sometimes stylized in all lowercase) is a song by American singer Ariana Grande from her fourth studio album Sweetener, released in 2018. It was written by Grande and Pharrell Williams, production being handled by the latter. The song title inspired the name for Grande's makeup brand, R.E.M. Beauty.

Background and composition

"R.E.M." is a R&B song containing a doo-wop beat. It runs for a duration of four minutes and six seconds. The song "Dream" was originally recorded as a demo by T-Pain on March 12, 2011, and ran for a duration of four minutes and 27 seconds. It was then passed onto Beyoncé and recorded under the title "Wake Up" in 2013. Grande kept the chorus, but changed the song's lyrics. She previewed "R.E.M." prior to the release of Sweetener.

The song's title refers to rapid eye movement sleep, and is about "a relationship that blurs between the dreamworld and reality". Grande has said "R.E.M." is about "dreaming someone into your life", and is one of her favorite tracks on Sweetener. Grande's vocals span 2 octaves, from Eb3 to Eb5.

Reception
"R.E.M." received mixed reception from music critics. In 2018, Complex Mallorie List ranked "R.E.M." number two on her list of "The Best Ariana Grande Songs". Christopher Rosa of Glamour called the song's lyrics "a tad generic". Out Dennis Hinzmann said the track "feels like a throwback and a fresh pick all at the same time".

Live performances 
Grande first premiered a 20 second snippet of the song on Elle magazine's Youtube channel, during their game "Song Association" on July 12, 2018.
Grande also performed a snippet of the song on The Tonight Show Starring Jimmy Fallon on August 16, 2018. The song was officially debuted live on August 20, 2018 at The Sweetener Sessions.

She also performed the song live on BBC Radio 1 in September 2018, and on the one-hour special, Ariana Grande at the BBC, which was recorded on September 7, 2018, and aired on November 1.

This song is also one of the songs from the set list of her Sweetener World Tour.

Credits and personnel
Credits and personnel adapted from the liner notes of Sweetener.

Recording and management
 Recorded at Midnight Blue Studios (Miami, Florida) and Conway Recording Studios (Hollywood, California)
 Mixed at Callanwolde Fine Arts Center (Atlanta, Georgia)
 Mastered at Sterling Sound (New York City, New York)
 Published by EMI Pop Music Publishing/More Water From Nazareth (GMR)

Personnel

 Ariana Grande — lead vocals
 Pharrell Williams — songwriting, production, additional vocals
 Andrew Coleman – recording, digital editing and arrangement for I Am Other Entertainment
 Mike Larson – recording, digital editing, arrangement and additional programming for I Am Other Entertainment
 Guilhermo Lefeld – recording assistant
 Jon Sher – recording assistant
 Phil Tan – mixing
 Bill Zimmerman – additional engineering
 Randy Merrill – mastering

Charts

See also
 Pharrell Williams production discography

References

External links
 
 

2011 songs
2013 songs
2018 songs
Ariana Grande songs
T-Pain songs
Beyoncé songs
Song recordings produced by Pharrell Williams
Songs written by Ariana Grande
Songs written by Pharrell Williams